USS Siboney (CVE-112/AKV-12) (ex-Frosty Bay) was a  of the United States Navy. She was the second ship named for Siboney, Cuba, the Cuban Village near which troops of Theodore Roosevelt's Rough Riders fought during the Spanish–American War.

Siboney was laid down as Frosty Bay on 1 April 1944 by the Todd-Pacific Shipyards at Tacoma, Washington; renamed Siboney on 26 April 1944; launched on 9 November 1944; sponsored by Mrs. Charles F. Greber; and commissioned on 14 May 1945, Captain Stanhope Cotton Ring in command.

Service history
Siboney completed fitting out on 23 May 1945 in the Seattle area, and on 31 May 1945, sailed for San Diego. She held shakedown operations in the Bay Area until 3 August. The carrier then loaded bombs, aircraft, and personnel from Air Group 36, and on 8 August departed for Pearl Harbor. Hostilities with Japan ceased the day before Siboney arrived, on 15 August, to discharge her cargo. She was in Hawaiian waters until early September when she sailed for Okinawa, via the Marshall, Caroline, and Philippine Islands.

On 5 October, she stood out of Buckner Bay for Honshū, Japan. En route, the carrier conducted air search operations in an attempt to locate Rear Admiral William Dodge Sample and his PBM Mariner, which had been missing since 2 October. Siboney called at Honshū from 8–11 October, and then continued the search for the missing Mariner, with negative results. The ship operated in the Tokyo Bay area from 24 October until 16 November 1945, when she was ordered to return to the United States. After port calls at Saipan, Manila, Hong Kong, Guam, and Pearl Harbor, she arrived at San Diego on 23 January 1946. The carrier deployed to the western Pacific again from 15 February – 7 May.

Siboney stood out of San Diego on 9 June 1947, en route to Norfolk, Virginia. The carrier arrived on 26 June and operated between there and Guantánamo Bay, Cuba until November, when she was inactivated. In March 1948, Siboney was returned to active duty, and, in May, ferried former United States Air Force planes to Yesilkoy, Turkey. She returned to Norfolk for a month and made another voyage to the Near East before entering the Boston Naval Shipyard in October 1948 for a three-month overhaul.

Siboney stood out of Boston in January 1949 for Guantanamo Bay and refresher training. The carrier operated with the Atlantic Fleet until 6 December 1949, when she was placed in the inactive fleet at Philadelphia.

The outbreak of war in Korea in June 1950 brought a need for more combat ships, and Siboney was returned to an active status on 22 November 1950. The carrier put to sea on 2 February 1951 and was assigned to Norfolk. From 27 February – 10 April, she carried out extensive training exercises in the Guantanamo Bay area.

She operated in Canadian waters in July and, from September to 14 November, in the Mediterranean with North Atlantic Treaty Organisation (NATO) units. Siboney participated in evaluation tests and carrier qualifications of A-1 Skyraiders and F4U Corsairs in January 1952. She also tested the new concept of vertical landings, using Marine helicopters. The ship was modernized at the Norfolk Naval Shipyard and rejoined the fleet on 20 January 1953. After training in the Caribbean, she operated in the Atlantic with a hunter-killer group until August. From 16 September-1 December, Siboney was again deployed with the 6th Fleet.

1954–1955 were spent in fleet operations along the east coast, from New England to the Caribbean and in midshipman cruises to Spain during the summers. Siboney was overhauled at the Philadelphia Naval Shipyard from 28 September 1954 – 22 January 1955. She operated along the east coast until 4 October, when she was ordered to load as many supplies as possible and sail for Mexican waters in the Gulf. Until 19 October, helicopters from the carrier flew relief missions and transported supplies to the inhabitants of Tampico which had been devastated by a hurricane and subsequent flooding.

1956 was Siboneys last year of active service with the fleet. She operated along the east coast from January–May, and then made a final cruise with the 6th Fleet from 26 May – 6 July. The carrier sailed to Philadelphia on 27 July and, four days later, was placed in reserve, out of commission, with the Atlantic Reserve Fleet. Siboney was struck from the Naval Vessel Register on 1 June 1970, and sold to Union Minerals and Alloys Corps. a year later for scrap.

See also
  lists other ships of the same name.
 The Ciboney people were indigenous occupants of the Antilles islands of the Caribbean.

References

External links

 

Commencement Bay-class escort carriers
World War II escort aircraft carriers of the United States
Cold War aircraft carriers of the United States
Ships built in Tacoma, Washington
1944 ships